Robjohn is an unincorporated community in Choctaw County, Alabama, United States. Robjohn had a post office, which opened on July 14, 1888, and closed on January 31, 1955.

References

Unincorporated communities in Choctaw County, Alabama
Unincorporated communities in Alabama